Holger is a Scandinavian masculine given name derived from the Old Norse name Hólmgeirr, a compound of hólmr meaning "island", and geirr meaning "spear". It is most common amongst Danish people. It is uncommon as a surname, but is found as Holkeri in Finnish. People with the name include:

 Holger Albrechtsen (1906–1992), Norwegian hurdler
 Holger Badstuber, German footballer
 Holger Behrendt, German gymnast and Olympic champion
 Holger Börner (1931–2006), German politician 
 Holger Cahill (1887–1960), American, National Director of the Federal Art Project
 Holger Chen, Taiwanese YouTuber
 Holger Crafoord (1908–1982), Swedish industrialist who established the Crafoord Prize
 Holger Czukay, German musician
 Holger Drachmann (1846–1908), Danish poet and dramatist
 Holger Fach, German football player and manager
 Holger Glandorf, German former professional handballer
 Holger Granström (1917–1941), Finnish ice hockey player 
 Holger Gustafsson, Swedish politician
 Holger Hansen (1929–2015), Danish politician and academic
 Holger Juul Hansen, Danish actor
 Holger Henning (1905–1981), Swedish Navy vice admiral
 Holger Hieronymus (born 1959), German football player
 Holger Hiller, German musician
 Holger Hott, Norwegian athletic 
 Holger Löwenadler (1904–1977), Swedish film actor
 Hólger Matamoros (born 1985), Ecuadorian football player
 Holger Bech Nielsen, Danish physicist
 Holger K. Nielsen, Danish politician
 Holger Osieck, German football coach
 Hólger Quiñónez (born 1962), Ecuadorian football player
 Holger Romander (1921-2020), Swedish civil servant
 Holger Simon Paulli (1810–1891), Danish conductor and composer
 Holger Pedersen (linguist) (1867–1953), Danish linguist
 Holger Pedersen (astronomer) (born 1946), Danish astronomer
 Holger Petersen, Canadian businessman, record producer and radio broadcaster
 Holger Rasmusen (1894–1983), American politician
 Holger Roed (1846–1874), Danish painter
 Holger Sundström (born 1925), Swedish sailor
 Holger Thiele (1878–1946), Danish-American astronomer
 Holger Vitus Nødskov Rune (born 2003), Danish tennis player

References

Masculine given names
Danish masculine given names
Scandinavian masculine given names
German masculine given names
Norwegian masculine given names
Swedish masculine given names